Phanote or Phanota, or Phanoteia, was a strongly fortified ancient Greek town of Chaonia located in the region of Epirus. The town's location was of military/strategic importance as it stood in the midst of a valley surrounded by an amphitheatre of mountains, through which there are only two narrow passes. It lies about halfway between the sea and the Antigonean passes, and was therefore of importance to the Romans when they were advancing from Illyria in 169 BCE. Its site is tentatively located near the modern Raveni.

See also
List of cities in ancient Epirus

References

Citations

Sources

External links

Entry on the website of the Greek Ministry of Culture about the archeological site at Doliani (in Greek)

Cities in ancient Epirus
Former populated places in Greece
Populated places in ancient Epirus
Chaonia